Constantine V (11 January 1833 – 27 February 1914) was Ecumenical Patriarch of Constantinople from 1897 to 1901. His secular name was Konstantinos Valiadis and he was born on January 11, 1833, at Vessa, on the island of Chios. He died on February 27, 1914.

References

1833 births
1914 deaths
Clergy from Chios
Bishops of Ephesus
Deaths from diabetes
19th-century Ecumenical Patriarchs of Constantinople
20th-century Ecumenical Patriarchs of Constantinople